Cik Dat bin Anjang Abdullah, commonly known as Abdullah CD (born 2 October 1923), is a former Malaysian politician who served as chairman and General Secretary of the Communist Party of Malaya (CPM).

Biography
Abdullah was born on 2 October 1923 in Parit, Perak to Minangkabau parents. His involvement in politics was sparked by interests in the Maharajalela Wars against the British. As a young man, he joined the Kesatuan Melayu Muda (KMM), and became the secretary of the KMM in the Lambor district in Perak during the early stages of the Japanese Occupation.

After World War II, Abdullah CD was involved in the setting up of the Malay Nationalist Party (or in Malay, the Parti Kebangsaan Melayu Muda / PKMM) in October 1945 with other early leftist Malay leaders such as Mokhtaruddin Lasso, Dr. Burhanuddin al-Helmy, Ahmad Boestamam, Ishak Haji Muhammad, amongst others. He was also responsible for organising the Malay labour movement, and was elected as the vice-president of the Pan-Malayan Federation of Trade Unions (PMFTU).

Not long before the declaration of emergency in Malaya in June 1948 by the British colonial government, Abdullah CD, Dr. Burhanuddin Helmi and Ahmad Boestamam conducted a meeting to discuss the conditions and steps to be taken in the struggle for Malayan independence. When the British declared an emergency, Abdullah led many members from the CPM, PKMM, API (Angkatan Pemuda Insaf), AWAS and PETA into an anti-British guerrilla revolution in the jungles of Malaya. In July 1948, he was captured in north Pahang, but he managed to escape.

On 12 May 1949, Abdullah started the 10th Regiment of the CPM in Temerloh, Pahang, and continued to be its leader until peace was achieved in 1989. On 2 December 1989, he was one of the signatories of the peace agreement between the CPM and the government of Malaysia, finally ending the period of armed struggle.

Abdullah was involved in many armed battles against the British, and suffered serious injuries from a hand grenade explosion. He was married to Suriani Abdullah (née Eng Ming Ching), also a leader of the CPM and have been married since February 1955. They remained married in Sukhirin, Thailand until Suriani's death in 2013.

References

1923 births
Living people
People from Perak
Malaysian communists
Malaysian politicians
Malaysian people of Minangkabau descent
Muslim socialists